Richland Township is a township in Ford County, Kansas, USA.  As of the 2000 census, its population was 931. This had declined to 893 at the 2020 census.

Geography

References

 USGS Geographic Names Information System (GNIS)

External links
 US-Counties.com
 City-Data.com

Townships in Ford County, Kansas
Townships in Kansas